Qāsim ibn ʿAbbas is regarded by some sources  among the martyrs of the Battle of Karbala., in later sources Qasim ibn Abbas is referred to as the son of Abbas ibn Ali with his mother being Lubaba bint Ubayd Allah ibn Abbas. He and his brother Fadl died in the Battle of Karbala.

References 

People killed at the Battle of Karbala